CAP is a Chilean holding company of the mining and steel sectors. These sectors are represented by different affiliates.

The first stage is done through Compañía Minera del Pacífico and involves the extraction and concentration of iron ore from the company's deposits in northern Chile. This production is sold as raw material between steel producers, mainly in the Asian market (China, Japan, Malaysia, Korea and Indonesia).

The second stage is done through Compañía Siderúrgica Huachipato and involves the use in Chile on behalf of CAP for the production of iron ore to produce flat and long steel, for the most varied industries.

The third and final phase of CAP's activity, using in turn part of steel production, is the development of solutions in steel, processed by subsidiaries in Chile, for use in construction, industry and infrastructure solutions that also marketed by subsidiaries in other countries of our region. This stage of CAP's activity is through Cintac S.A. and Intasa S.A. and their respective subsidiaries.

CAP is listed on the Santiago Stock Exchange in the IPSA index.

References 

Investment companies of Chile
Chilean companies established in 1946
Mining companies of Chile
Steel companies of Chile
Companies established in 1946
Companies based in Santiago
Companies listed on the Santiago Stock Exchange